Abbas Halim (Egyptian Arabic: عباس حليم, 9 October 1897 – 6 July 1978), also known as Nabil Abbas Halim or Sherief Abbas Halim, was a prince of the Muhammad Ali Dynasty and a labour activist in Egypt.

Early military career and personal life

Born in Alexandria at the end of the 19th century, Halim was educated in Germany and fought with the German air force during the First World War, becoming a fighter pilot. He later joined the Ottoman air force. After returning to Egypt, Halim founded boxing and sports clubs, led an Egyptian automobile club, and participated in safari hunting.

Michel Antoine Mamlouk recounts that Halim had three children, Mohamed Ali, Ulvia and Nevine, who were educated in Virginia and Pennsylvania in the United States, and that Halim owned the Khedivial Mail Line fleet.

Political activism in Egypt

Halim joined the Wafd Party and fought with his cousin King Fuad I, while also opposing prime minister Isma'il Sidqi's constitutional reforms in 1930. In December 1930 Halim became president of the Egyptian National Federation of Trade Unions, where he fought for improved working and living conditions for the Egyptian working class. King Fuad crossed his name from the list of royal family members after he published a pamphlet stating that the dismissal of democratically elected leaders could cause civil war in Egypt. Halim's association with the Wafd Party was strained in 1931 when he proposed the formation of an Egyptian labor party, though he later reached an agreement with Wafd leader Mustafa el-Nahhas. Following Sidqi's replacement by Abdel Fattah Yahya Ibrahim Pasha Halim redoubled his efforts to organize Egyptian workers, leading to his imprisonment in 1934, which he protested with a hunger strike. His hunger strike led to widespread workers protests and his release.

Halim tried to organize a strike at the Misr Spinning and Weaving Company in El-Mahalla El-Kubra in 1936. He left politics later that year, returning the next year and attempting to lead The Committee to Organize the Workers' Movement. He later let the Cairo Tramway Workers' Union and helped organize the Join Transport Federation. According to historian Joel Beinin, Halim and the Wafd both viewed trade union struggles within Egypt as part of a larger nationalist political movement, and not as a political struggle by the working class against class society more broadly. As class conflict intensified in Egypt and the popularity of the Communist Party increased, Halim saw his own influence and that of the nationalist trade unions decline.

Halim was arrested for two years by the British in the 1940s for pro-German sympathies during the Second World War; in the event that the advancing German army led by Erwin Rommel had occupied Cairo, Halim was considered the most likely candidate to be installed as King of Egypt. Despite this, Halim later said that British Ambassador Killearn had at one point asked if the British should appoint him King. British officials called Halim "very popular but obstinate and stupid." Halim was sentenced to 15 years in prison after the Egyptian Revolution of 1952 by the Gamal Abdel Nasser government. While his property was confiscated from him for a time, it was returned in 1975.

References

Sources

1897 births
1978 deaths
Egyptian democracy activists
Egyptian dissidents
20th-century Egyptian politicians
Muhammad Ali dynasty
Politicians from Alexandria
Place of death missing